Operation MH-2 was the first major battle in the Kumanovo Karadak region during the insurgency in the Republic of Macedonia.

Execution of the Operation MH - 2
Macedonian forces started to demine the fields at 8 a.m. and attacked with one mechanized battalion with support of artillery villages: Slupčane, Ljubodrag, Lopate and Orizare.
Around 2 p.m. the operation was stopped by orders of Boris Trajkovski over the phone to general Pande Petrovski.

See also
 Operation Vaksince
 Testimonies 2001

References

2001 insurgency in Macedonia
Kumanovo Municipality
Lipkovo Municipality
2001 in the Republic of Macedonia
Battles in 2001